Pleasant Plains may refer to several places in the United States of America:

 Pleasant Plains, Arkansas
 Pleasant Plains, Illinois
 Pleasant Plains, New Jersey
 Pleasant Plains, Dutchess County, New York
 Pleasant Plains, Staten Island, New York
 Pleasant Plains (Staten Island Railway station)
 Pleasant Plains, Washington, D.C.
 Pleasant Plains Township, Michigan